No. 146 Wing RAF was a formation of the Royal Air Force during the Second World War. It comprised No. 193 Squadron RAF, No. 197 Squadron RAF, No. 257 Squadron RAF, No. 263 Squadron RAF and No. 266 Squadron RAF.

From April 1944 RAF Needs Oar Point was a base for Hawker Typhoon fighter-bomber squadrons of No. 146 Wing of the 2nd Tactical Air Force supporting the Normandy landings. RAFWeb.org however lists the actual establishment date of the wing as 12 May 1944.

The squadrons operated Hawker Typhoons in ground attack operations under the command of John Robert Baldwin.

On 6 June 1944, the day of the Normandy landings, the wing was under the command of No. 20 (Fighter) Sector, No. 84 Group RAF.

The wing was disbanded on 7 September 1945.

References

Wings of the Royal Air Force in the Second World War
Military units and formations disestablished in 1945